George Louis Vokins (3 August 1896 – 6 June 1985) was a British modern pentathlete. He competed at the 1924 Summer Olympics. 

He was born in Preston, Lancashire the son of a British cavalry soldier. He and a younger brother were both pupils at the Duke of York's Royal Military School in Dover, Kent. He went on to join the British Army serving in the cavalry in World War 1 and the interwar years; and later the Royal Armoured Corps Yeomanry during the Second World War. He was awarded the Military Medal (twice) and later made a Member of the British Empire.

References

External links

1896 births
1985 deaths
Members of the Order of the British Empire
Recipients of the Military Medal
People educated at the Duke of York's Royal Military School
British Army personnel of World War I
British Army personnel of World War II
British Army soldiers
Royal Armoured Corps soldiers
Military personnel from Preston, Lancashire
British male modern pentathletes
Olympic modern pentathletes of Great Britain
Modern pentathletes at the 1924 Summer Olympics
Sportspeople from Preston, Lancashire